Elizabeth Emmet Lenox-Conyngham also known as Mrs. George Lenox Conyngham (1800 – c. 1889) was an Irish poet and translator.

Life
Elizabeth Emmet Lenox-Conyngham was born Elizabeth Emmet Holmes in Dublin in 1800. She was the only surviving child of Robert Holmes and Mary Anne Holmes (née Emmet). Her maternal uncle was Robert Emmet. She married George Lenox Conyngham of Springhill House (1796-1887), chief clerk in the Foreign Office in London, in early 1827. The couple had a son, George Lenox-Conyngham known as Gino (d. 1866), and a daughter, Mary Ann Grace Louisa Lenox-Conyngham known as May (d. 1907).

Lenox-Conyngham published her first book in 1833, The Dream, and Other Poems, which included some poems from her mother as well as translations from the German poet Friedrich von Matthisson. These translations received praise from the editor of the Dublin University Magazine, Charles Stuart Stanford. It was his contention that "perhaps, the first lady in this country who made German literature her study." In the years that followed she published three more volumes: Hella and other poems (1836), Horae poeticae: lyrical and other poems (1859), and Eiler and Helvig: a Danish legend in verse (1863). She also wrote List of Italian Authors on Military Science, communicated by Major Portlock R. E., F. R. S. which was published by "Paper 11" in First Number of the [Engineers] Corps papers, and memoirs on military subjects.

Her father was living with her in his retirement in London in 1852. It would appear that she dies around 1889. Her daughter, May, married Hayes St Leger, 4th Viscount Doneraile whose papers hold correspondence relating to Lenox-Conyngham's family.

References 

1800 births
1889 deaths
Writers from Dublin (city)
19th-century Irish poets
19th-century Irish women writers
Lenox-Conyngham family